St. Mary's Convent School, Kasauli, Himachal Pradesh, India, 
was established in 1958 by the Roman Catholic Church of India. The founder of the school was Dr. James Robert Knox, Apostolic Internuncio of India in 1962. Following the C.B.S.E system of education, St. Mary's is spread over a comfortably sized campus in the heart of Kasauli. The school educates boys and girls of all castes and religions.

History 
Initially the school started as a day boarding with just eight students, and consisted of a small building situated near the historic military hospital established in 1861. The school officially came into existence in 1958 under control of the St. Patrick's Church in Kasauli. Baltazar Pereira was the parish priest, in charge of the church. He headed the school for a few years and soon started facing difficulties due to the growing number of students. It was then that the Bishop of the Simla Diocese invited the congregation of The Sisters of the Destitute to take over the school. Since then the school has been under the management of these nuns who belong to the Syro-Malabar Catholic Church. The management also runs the Sacred Heart Convent School at Jagadhri. The school started imparting quality education and the number of students increased rapidly. The main building came into existence in the 1970s near the St. Patrick's Church Kasauli built by the British Army. The school now runs a boarding school for girls.

St. Patrick's Church 
St. Patrick's is located at the highest point of the school campus. Built in 1847, it was maintained by the Kasauli garrison. It was run by the Franciscan missionaries of the English province.  The church was erected by contributions from the East India Company, Father Candidus, the 32nd  (Cornwall) Regiment and  Her Majesty's 61st Regiment (61st foot-Irish regt.) The church mainly served the Irish soldiers posted at Kasauli.  Candidus was the first priest to run the church. 

According to the church records the earliest baptism was in 1853.  A girl named Fanny (daughter of Edward and Elizabeth) was baptised on 27 February 1853 by Candidus.

St. Patrick's is a Roman Catholic church that comes under the administration of the Simla-Chandigarh Diocese where the Bishop is the head. The church is managed by a parish priest who is a member of the diocese. The church still maintains its grandeur and is famous for its unique wooden interiors.

The present Parish Priest is Titus Babu of the Simla Chandigarh Diocese. He is also the chaplain for the sisters of the covent.

Buildings 
The school resides in five interconnected buildings.
The Office Block - This block consists of the principal's office, reception and office, computer lab, sick bay, junior dormitory, kindergarten and Play school.
Junior School - Connected to the office block by a bridge this compact block has a few classrooms, a maths lab and a mini hall .
The Main School - This building consists of 4 floors housing the senior dormitory, senior school, middle school and a portion of the primary section. It has science labs, a book shop and two staff rooms.
Hostel Block - Consists of the girls hostel, the refectory, the 300 seater auditorium, the music and dance department, the library, the glass room, the chapel and guest rooms.
St. Patrick's Church - An old church built by the British Army is a shrine of history.

Academics 
St. Mary's is affiliated with the Central Board of Secondary Education (CBSE) and functions up to the senior secondary level of education (class 12). Children are taught from the very beginning to work hard at various subjects. Students of the school are generally toppers in the CBSE exam in Himachal Pradesh. The highest percentage for the 2007 CBSE exam was 96% with 98% of the students getting first divisions.

Co-curricular activities 
The school has managed to train a basketball team and a table tennis team. Students can also enroll for morning games which includes a jog around Kasauli at about 6:30 AM followed by a game of B'ball at school.

The Station Headquarters provides the military parade ground for students to play cricket and soccer. It also helps the school by providing equipment for various functions. The sports week of the school is also held at the military ground. 

A morning parade is held at the school basketball court in the presence of the school brass band followed by the morning assembly. 

Music has always been the strong point of St. Mary's. Known for its school orchestra students learn every possible instrument. The school has a brass band that plays for all morning assemblies and a school choir that teaches most students to sing.

Management (2008) 

 Principal: Sr. Salvy S.D
 Vice Principal: Sr. Shanti SD

Ao'sm -OSA 
The St. Mary's Kasauli-Old Students Association is an autonomous alumni body formed by a group of old students with the cooperation of the school authorities. Ao'sm as it is known today aims at promoting coordination and communication between the school and the alumni. 

The association aims at forming a close association of old students for the welfare of the school and its alumni.

External links

Catholic boarding schools in India
Boarding schools in Himachal Pradesh
Christian schools in Himachal Pradesh
Schools in Solan district